Croesyceiliog School is a state-funded secondary school in the Croesyceiliog area of Cwmbran, in South Wales, UK.

Setting
Situated on high ground that overlooks the valley westwards, the school site lies within the parish of Llanyrafon, with the Croesyceiliog By-Pass A4042 and headquarters of Gwent Police to the east, and the Afon Llwyd to the west.

Most pupils live in the areas of Croesyceiliog, Llanyrafon and Pontnewydd; however the Sixth Form attracts students from as far as parts of Newport and Pontypool.

The school grounds also hosts a local youth centre. Cwmbran's river (the Afon Llwyd) is situated at the lower western end of the site. The school is surrounded by woodland; Jim Crow's Wood to the north and Middle Wood to the south.

History

Foundation
Cwmbran New Town was established in 1949, and the Development Corporation's Master Plan stated that three secondary modern schools would be built in the new town. Croesyceiliog however would be a "campus" whereby a grammar school and community college would be built alongside it. The school was designed by the Monmouthshire County Architect, Colin Jones. The secondary modern was opened on 5 November 1957, followed by the grammar school on 3 February 1960. Colin Jones died before the grammar school was completed. In 1960, the final costs of construction for the campus had reached £250,000. Today it would cost around £43 million.

Comprehensive

In September 1970, the campus of the two schools and college merged to form the Croesyceiliog Bilateral School, where the Secondary Modern (East) buildings housed the lower three forms, and the Grammar (West) buildings housed the upper three. It was officially named Croesyceiliog Comprehensive School the following year. In January 1975 the new Sixth Form building opened in the centre of the school. In the 1970s and 80s, a dozen prefabricated buildings were constructed around the school as the pupil population reached nearly 2,000. Three of the prefabs remain as Welsh language classrooms and a fourth was rebuilt as a Youth Centre behind the Community College (now Music suite). In 2006 a Fitness Suite opened to the rear of the West Gymnasiums, and in 2010 a perimeter fence was installed surrounding the entire site.

In the 2005 inspection the school had one of the best reports in the county. The following year the then-Deputy Prime Minister John Prescott visited the school.

In 2012, Crownbridge School, an education centre aimed at children aged 11–19 with learning or physical disabilities, was built on playing fields south of the school site. The previous Crownbridge School, situated on Greenhill Road in Sebastapol, had fallen into disrepair.

In July 2017, plans were submitted for the "demolition of existing school buildings and erection of a new three storey 11-16 school building, the erection of a new two storey Sixth Form and sports block (D1 educational use), the construction of a new, floodlit artificial grass pitch (AGP), a new access junction, external play and sport areas, car parking, associated infrastructure and landscaping on the site". In March 2018, the plans were amended to not include a Sixth Form provision as a new post-16 education facility is to be constructed on land east of Cwmbran Centre, set to be opened by September 2020.
The school came in for heavy criticism from the South Wales Argus and The Daily Telegraph after encouraging a teacher to not pursue action, after a coke can was dropped by a pupil and hit her on the head. School staff informed police they did not want an investigation in fear of "criminalising children".
Moreover, in 2017, the school decided to review its uniform policy, after parents complained that the school refused pupils requests to remove jumpers in a heat wave.

List of Head Teachers 
 Granville Lewis Pomeroy (1916–1991), served 1957–1970: Pomeroy was the headmaster of the Secondary Modern School and the Community College. Pomeroy's wife was an English teacher at the school. Following the merger in 1970, Pomeroy became headteacher of Caerleon Comprehensive School until his retirement in 1980.
 Dr Donald John B. Summers CBE (1909–1999), served 1960–1975: Summers attended Oxford University, where he studied Chemistry, and later completed his PhD. He was known for wearing the traditional headmaster's gown. He was the first and last headmaster of the Grammar School, as well as holding the position of headmaster for the Secondary Modern from 1970 until its merger with the Grammar School in 1971 and of the Comprehensive School entirely until 1975.
 Mike J. Pugh, served 1975–1991: The first post-modern headmaster of the Comprehensive School, he oversaw the introduction of GCSE and A-Level qualifications following the Education Reform Act in 1988.
 Helene Mansfield OBE, served 1991–2009: The longest-serving and first female headteacher of Croesyceiliog, Mansfield was born in Brittany, and studied languages for her research year at Downing College, Cambridge.
Sarah Jane Logan, served 2009–2013: Logan was previously deputy headmistress of Bassaleg School. She implemented new security features at the school and oversaw the redevelopment of the main school lobby and the construction of Crownbridge School on the site.
David Taylor, served 2013–2020: Taylor oversaw the construction of a new Croesyceiliog School, due to open in September 2019 and the demolition of the entire former campus thereafter.
Elspeth Lewis, serving 2020-2022
 Mrs N Richards 2022 - present

Notable former pupils

 Nick Ramsay, the Conservative AM since 2007 for Monmouth
 Jessica Morden, Labour MP since 2005 for Newport East
Adam Hughes, Newport Gwent Dragons and Wales U20 rugby
 Terry Morgan, CBE, former MD of Land Rover and now Chairman of Crossrail.

Croesyceiliog Grammar School

 Rt Rev Gregory Cameron, Bishop of St Asaph since 2009. 
 Green Gartside, of pop band Scritti Politti.
 Denise Kingsmill, Baroness Kingsmill
 Jeremy Winston, Dean of Monmouth

References

External links
 School student page & department websites
 School administrative homepage
 EduBase

Secondary schools in Torfaen
Educational institutions established in 1971
Cwmbran